The Akiek are an ethnic and linguistic group in  Kenya, living in southern Kenya, with an estimated population of 3,700 people. The Akiek language is said to be a moribund language: only a few elderly speakers are left. The Akiek in Tanzania now speak Maasai, and those in Kenya speak kalenjin.

The Akiek are a subgroup of the Ogiek or Okiek, who intermarried and lost contact with the core of the Ogiek. The terms Akiek and Okiek are sometimes used interchangeably and confusingly. The correct name of the original people is Ogiek.

See also
OGIEK
Ogiek language

References

Ethnic groups in Kenya
Ethnic groups in Tanzania